Agasta is a genus of leaf beetles in the subfamily Chrysomelinae distributed in South China and Indo-Malayan region.

Species 
Two species are included in the genus:
 Agasta annamica Kimoto & Gressitt, 1981 – Vietnam
 Agasta formosa Hope, 1840 – China, Vietnam, Laos, Thailand, Burma, India, Indonesia

References

External links 

 

Chrysomelinae
Chrysomelidae genera
Taxa named by Frederick William Hope
Beetles of Asia